The fifth and final season of the legal drama series Damages premiered July 11, 2012 on the DirecTV owned Audience Network concluding on September 12, 2012. The season has 10 episodes, making a series total of 59 episodes. The fifth season was released on DVD in region 1 on July 16, 2013.

Cast and characters

Main cast 
 Glenn Close as Patty Hewes (10 episodes)
 Rose Byrne as Ellen Parsons (10 episodes)
 Ryan Phillippe as Channing McClaren (10 episodes)

Recurring cast

Episodes

Production 
For its first three seasons, Damages aired on the FX Network, but the series' ratings continued to decline, and on April 4, 2010, FX announced that they would not be renewing Damages for a fourth season, though by that time rumors of the series being picked up by DirecTV had already begun to circulate. On July 19, 2010, DirecTV announced that it had officially picked up the series for a fourth and fifth season, each consisting of ten episodes. It was confirmed in February 2012 that the fifth season would be final season of the series.

As a tie-in to the season, DirecTV launched McClarenTruth.org, the website owned and operated by Ryan Phillippe's character. There, viewers are able to browse through several breaking stories and contact the editor on 1-855-GOTRUTH.

As with previous seasons, season five is executive produced by creators Todd A. Kessler, Glenn Kessler and Daniel Zelman. Mark A. Baker serves as a co-executive producer with Jason Wilborn and Greer Yeaton as co-producers, Lori Jo Nemhouser as producer and David Manson and Hans Tobeason as consulting producers.

Reception

Awards and nominations 
For its fifth and final season, Glenn Close received her third Golden Globe nomination for Best Actress – Television Series Drama, after being absent the previous two years.

Critical reviews 
The fifth season premiere received positive reviews from television critics, and earned a 79 out of 100 based on 8 reviews on the aggregate review website Metacritic. On Rotten Tomatoes, the season has an approval rating of 85% with an average score of 7.4 out of 10 based on 13 reviews. The website's critical consensus reads, "Damages concludes with nary a crack across its artistic integrity; the fifth and final season bringing the contentious mentorship between Patty Hewes and Ellen Parsons to a satisfying finish."

References

External links 
 

2012 American television seasons
season 5